Three Hanks: Men with Broken Hearts is a collaborative studio album released by Curb Records in 1996. It combines the songs of Hank Williams, who died in 1953, with newly recorded accompanying vocals from his son Hank Williams Jr. and grandson Hank Williams III, the latter of whom makes his recording debut. Aside from Hank Williams' songs, this album also features a new song written by Hank Williams Jr. titled "Hand Me Down". The album was recorded largely to cover Williams III's child support debts.

Track listing

Personnel
Eddie Bayers - drums, background vocals
J.T. Corenflos - electric guitar
Larry Franklin - fiddle
Paul Franklin - steel guitar
Dann Huff - electric guitar
David Hungate - bass guitar, tic tac bass, background vocals
Brent Mason - electric guitar
Terry McMillan - harmonica
Steve Nathan - keyboards
Brent Rowan - electric guitar
Michael Spriggs - acoustic guitar
Audrey Williams - background vocals
Hank Williams - lead vocals
Hank Williams III - lead vocals
Hank Williams Jr. - acoustic guitar, lead vocals, background vocals
John Willis - electric guitar
Glenn Worf - bass guitar

Chart performance

References

External links
 Hank Williams, Sr's official website
 Hank Williams Jr's official website
 Hank III's official website
 Record label

1996 albums
Hank Williams albums
Hank Williams Jr. albums
Hank Williams III albums
Curb Records albums